Chaim (Halevi) Soloveitchik (Yiddish: חיים סאָלאָווייטשיק), also known as Reb Chaim Brisker (1853 – 30 July 1918), was a rabbi and Talmudic scholar credited as the founder of the popular Brisker approach to Talmudic study within Judaism. He is also a member of the Soloveitchik dynasty, as the son of the Beis HaLevi.

He is also known as the Gra"ch (Hebrew: גר״ח), an abbreviation of "HaGaon Reb Chaim."

Biography 
Soloveitchik was born in Volozhin on March 25, 1853, where his father, Rabbi Yosef Dov Soloveitchik served as a lecturer in the famous Volozhiner Yeshiva. Prior to his birth, Soloveitchik's father was passed for the position of Rosh yeshiva at the Volozhiner Yeshiva, in favor of Naftali Tzvi Yehuda Berlin in 1854, ultimately resulting in their family moving away from Volozhin. After a few years, his father was appointed as a rabbi in Slutzk, where young Chaim was first educated. While still a youngster, his genius and lightning-quick grasp were widely recognized.

Despite Soloveitchik's father leaving the yeshiva, Berlin would request that Soloveitchik return as a member of the faculty of the Yeshiva in 1880, later requesting that he become assistant Rosh yeshiva alongside him. This would not last long, however, as the Russian Empire forced the yeshiva to close, resulting in Soloveitchik moving to Brisk, Belarus and succeeding his father as the rabbi of Brisk.

Soloveitchik was buried in Warsaw, in the Jewish Cemetery, having died on July 30, 1918 after seeking medical treatment in that area.

Works 
He is considered the founder of the "Brisker method" (in Yiddish: Brisker derech), a method of highly exacting and analytical Talmudical study that focuses on precise definition/s and categorization/s of Jewish law as commanded in the Torah. His works would have particular emphasis on the legal writings of Maimonides.

Soloveitchik's primary work was Chiddushei Rabbeinu Chaim, a volume of insights on Maimonides' Mishneh Torah which often would suggest novel understandings of the Talmud as well. Based on his teachings and lectures, his students wrote down his insights on the Talmud known as Chiddushi HaGRaCh Al Shas. This book is known as "Reb Chaim's stencils" and contains analytical insights into Talmudic topics.

Views 
Soloveitchik would work alongside Sholom Dovber Schneersohn, the fifth Lubavitch Rebbe, specifically for his work in counteracting antisemitic decrees by the czarist regime. He would expand the definition of who represented Amalek, claiming that all who sought to destroy the Jewish people were ideological decedents of the Jewish enemy.

Soloveitchik was an opponent of Zionism, and viewed it as a movement to destroy traditional Judaism and replace it with nationalism.

Family 
A member of the Soloveitchik-family rabbinical dynasty, he is commonly known as Reb Chaim Brisker ("Rabbi Chaim [from] Brisk").

He married the daughter of Refael Shapiro, who was also the granddaughter of Berlin, and had two famous sons, Yitchak Zev (also known as Rabbi Velvel Soloveitchik) who subsequently moved to Israel and Moshe who moved to the United States and subsequently served as a rosh yeshiva of Yeshiva Yitzchak Elchonon (YU/RIETS) in New York and who was in turn succeeded by his sons Joseph B. Soloveitchik (1903–1993) and Ahron Soloveichik (1917-2001). Yitchak Zev's son, Meshulam Dovid Soloveitchik (circa 1922 - 2021), headed a renowned yeshiva in Jerusalem; two of his other sons, Meir and Yosef Dov Soloveitchik, also led prominent yeshivas.

Soloveitchik had eight main students; his sons Moshe and Yitzchak Zev, Baruch Ber Lebowitz, Isser Zalman Meltzer, Elchonon Wasserman, Shlomo Polachek, Chaim Ozer Grodzinski and Shimon Shkop.

References

External links
Understanding Reb Chaim, Rabbi Yonoson Hughes, June 2010

1853 births
1918 deaths
People from Valozhyn
People from Oshmyansky Uyezd
Belarusian Orthodox rabbis
Soloveitchik rabbinic dynasty
Talmudists
Anti-Zionist Orthodox rabbis
Volozhin rosh yeshivas
19th-century rabbis from the Russian Empire
20th-century Russian rabbis